Radha Prem Rangi Rangali is Indian Marathi-language television show that aired on Colors Marathi. It started from 27 November 2017 and ended on 12 April 2019.

Plot 
It is a story focusing on Radha and Prem, who have 2 different school of thoughts. However, they both love their siblings too much and will go to any extent for their smile. The story said how these two opposite personalities will finally find love for each other.

Cast

Main
 Sachit Patil as Prem Deshmukh, Radha's husband, Anvita's brother.
 Veena Jagtap as Radha Prem Deshmukh, Prem's wife, Aditya's sister.

Recurring
 Kavita Lad as Madhuri Paranjape, Prem and Anvita's Mother and Vishwanath's wife.
 Shailesh Datar as Madhavrao Nimbalkar, Radha and Aditya's father.
 Aparna Aparajit as Nalini Madhavrao Nimbalkar, Radha and Aditya's mother. 
 Nirankar Namjoshi as Aditya Nimbalkar, Radha's brother, Anvita's husband, Madhavrao and Nalini's son. 
 Gautam Joglekar as Vishwanath Paranjape, Prem's step-father, Anvita's Biological father and Shakuntala's brother.
 Rugvedi Pradhan as Shravni Kaku, Radha's paternal aunt.
 Akshaya Gurav as Anvita, Prem's step-sister, Madhuri and Vishwanath's daughter and Aditya's wife.
 Vidya Karanjikar as Aaji, Madhavrao's mother, Nalini and Shravni's mother-in-law, Aditya and Radha's grandmother, Prem and Anvita's grandmother-in-law.
 Archana Nipankar as Deepika, Prem's ex-fiancee and his obsessive lover, Shakuntala's daughter.
 Sarika Navathe as Shakuntala, Vishwanath's sister, Deepika's mother.

Reception 
The Times of India praised the show stating "The makers of Radha Prem Rangi Rangli have always tried to keep the viewers glued with engrossing content."

Dubbed Versions 
The show was dubbed in Hindi as Radha Prem Ki Deewani aired from 28 May 2018 on Rishtey UK and from 2 December 2018 on Rishtey Asia.

References

External links
 Radha Prem Rangi Rangali at Voot
 

Colors Marathi original programming
Marathi-language television shows
2017 Indian television series debuts
2019 Indian television series endings